Translink (or TransLink) may refer to:

 TransLink (British Columbia), the public transport operator in Vancouver, Canada
 Translink (Northern Ireland), the public transport operator in Northern Ireland
 Translink (Queensland), the public transport operator in Queensland, Australia